Suzane Pires Cardozo (born Suzane Lira Pires; 17 August 1992), simply known as Suzane, is a Brazilian-born Portuguese professional footballer who plays as a midfielder for Associação Ferroviária de Esportes and the Portugal women's national team.

Early life
Suzane was born and raised in São Paulo.

Club career
Suzane has played for the Boston Breakers in the National Women's Soccer League. She was waived by the Boston Breakers in October 2015.

International career
Besides Brazil, Suzane was also eligible to play for Portugal through her paternal grandfather, who was born in Braga. She made her senior debut on 26 November 2015 in a 6–1 win over Montenegro.

Personal life
Suzane is married to Brazilian male footballer Gauther Martins Cardozo, whom she has a son, who is also called Gauther.

References

External links 

 
 Boston Breakers player profile

1992 births
Living people
Citizens of Portugal through descent
Portuguese women's footballers
Women's association football midfielders
Southern Connecticut State University alumni
College women's soccer players in the United States
Boston Breakers players
National Women's Soccer League players
Portugal women's international footballers
Portuguese expatriate footballers
Portuguese expatriate sportspeople in the United States
Expatriate women's soccer players in the United States
Footballers from São Paulo
Brazilian women's footballers
Associação Portuguesa de Desportos players
Santos FC (women) players
Associação Ferroviária de Esportes (women) players
Brazilian expatriate women's footballers
Brazilian expatriate sportspeople in the United States
Brazilian people of Portuguese descent
UEFA Women's Euro 2022 players
UEFA Women's Euro 2017 players